Kalju (also known as Kaljuküla) is a village in Saaremaa Parish, Saare County, Estonia, on the island of Saaremaa. As of 2011 Census, the settlement's population was 27.

There's an old wooden Pahna schoolhouse from 1877 located in Kalju village.

References

Villages in Saare County